Lariniophora is a genus of orb-weaver spiders containing the single species, Lariniophora ragnhildae. It was  first described by V. W. Framenau in 2011, and is only found in Australia.

References

External links

Araneidae
Monotypic Araneomorphae genera